The Restaurant Inspector is an observational documentary television series, fronted by Fernando Peire, which airs on British terrestrial television station, Channel 5. It is a spin-off from the popular British programme The Hotel Inspector. The first series, narrated by Holly Aird, commenced on 6 June 2011. Series 2, narrated by Caroline Quentin, began on 3 May 2012.

In this makeover reality show on struggling British restaurants, Peire, Director of London's world-famous The Ivy restaurant, goes undercover to sample the venue, food and service before revealing his identity and offering advice.

Episodes

Series 1 (2011)

Series 2 (2012)

References

External links

Business-related television series in the United Kingdom
Channel 5 (British TV channel) original programming
2011 British television series debuts
2012 British television series endings
English-language television shows
Hospitality industry in the United Kingdom